This is a list of people and other topics appearing on the cover of Time magazine in the 1960s. Time was first published in 1923. As Time became established as one of the United States' leading news magazines, an appearance on the cover of Time became an indicator of notability, fame or notoriety. Such features were accompanied by articles.

Between 1961 and 1969, all of the dates had been issued on Friday instead of Monday scheduled time frame.

For other decades, see Lists of covers of Time magazine.

1960

January 4 – Dwight D. Eisenhower, Man of the Year
January 11 – Population Explosion
January 18 – U.S. Commuters
January 25 – Nobusuke Kishi
February 1 – Hubert H. Humphrey
February 8 – Rómulo Betancourt
February 15 – James Reston
February 22 – Pete Quesada
February 29 – Pat Nixon
March 7 – Tom Mboya
March 14 – Ingmar Bergman
March 21 – Caryl Chessman
March 28 – Jacques Cousteau
April 4 – Robert Menzies
April 11 – Bowman Gray Jr.
April 18 – St. Paul by Lippo Memmi
April 25 – Lyndon B. Johnson
May 2 – Arnold Palmer
May 9 – John H. Loudon
May 16 – Francis Gary Powers
May 23 – Dwight D. Eisenhower, Harold Macmillan, Charles de Gaulle & Nikita Khrushchev
May 30 – Rodion Malinovsky
June 6 – U.S. Satellites
June 13 – Nikita Khrushchev
June 20 – Suburban Wife
June 27 – Douglas MacArthur II
July 4 – William Shakespeare
July 11 – Joseph P. Kennedy, Sr., Rose Kennedy, Jacqueline Kennedy & John F. Kennedy
July 18 – Lyndon B. Johnson
July 25 – Sherman Fairchild
August 1 – Nelson Rockefeller & Richard Nixon
August 8 – Che Guevara
August 15 – Mort Sahl
August 22 – Dag Hammarskjöld
August 29 – Rafer Johnson
September 5 – Margaret Chase Smith & Lucia M. Cormier
September 12 – Shah of Iran
September 19 – New Products
September 26 – Henry Cabot Lodge
October 3 – Cartoon by Herblock depicting Nikita Khrushchev, Fidel Castro, Gheorghe Gheorghiu-Dej, Todor Zhivkov, Antonín Novotný, János Kádár, Mehmet Shehu, Valerian Zorin & Josip Broz Tito
October 10 – Robert F. Kennedy
October 17 – Clark Kerr
October 24 – Paul Bagwell
October 31 – Richard Nixon
November 7 – John F. Kennedy
November 14 – Alan Jay Lerner & Frederick Loewe
November 16 – John F. Kennedy
November 21 – Hong Kong
November 28 – Sylvia Porter
December 5 – Abubakar Balewa
December 12 – John Courtney Murray
December 19 – Franz Josef Strauss
December 26 – Dean Rusk

1961

January 2 – U.S. Scientists (represented by George Beadle, Charles Draper, John Enders, Donald A. Glaser, Joshua Lederberg, Willard Libby, Linus Pauling, Edward Purcell, Isidor Rabi, Emilio Segrè, William Shockley, Edward Teller, Charles Townes, James Van Allen, and Robert Woodward), Men of the Year
January 6 – Harry Felt
January 13 – Ancel Keys
January 20 – Jacqueline Kennedy
January 27 – Kennedy Inauguration
February 3 – John B. McKone & Bruce Olmstead
February 10 – Samuel T. Rayburn
February 17 – Oscar Robertson
February 24 – Valerian Zorin
March 3 – Walter W. Heller
March 10 – Leontyne Price
March 17 – Savang Vatthana
March 24 – James M. Moran
March 31 – Guilt and Anxiety (The Scream by Edvard Munch)
April 7 – Robert S. McNamara
April 14 – Jean Kerr
April 21 – Yuri Gagarin
April 28 – Jose Miro Cardona
May 5 – Le Corbusier
May 12 – Alan Shepard
May 19 – The Faraway Places
May 26 – Eugene Carson Blake
June 2 – John Patterson
June 9 – John F. Kennedy
June 16 – Clint & John Murchison
June 23 – Barry Goldwater
June 30 – Jânio Quadros
July 7 – Leonard Larson
July 14 – Camping: Call of the Not So Wild
July 21 – Bill Mauldin
July 28 – Maxwell Taylor
August 4 – Ngo Dinh Diem
August 11 – Donald J.M. Russell
August 18 – C. Douglas Dillon
August 25 – Walter Ulbricht
September 1 – Lawrence F. O'Brien
September 8 – Nikita Khrushchev
September 15 – J.D. Salinger
September 22 – Arthur J. Goldberg
September 29 – Mongi Slim
October 6 – Jean Monnet
October 13 – Creighton Abrams
October 20 – Virgil Couch
October 27 – Thomas V. Jones
November 3 – Mary Bunting
November 10 – Glenn T. Seaborg
November 17 – John F. Enders
November 24 – Rembrandt's Aristotle Contemplating a Bust of Homer
December 1 – Li Fu-chun
December 8 – Willem Visser't Hooft
December 15 – Christmas Shopping
December 22 – Moise Tshombe
December 29 – Jackie Gleason

1962

January 5 – John F. Kennedy, Man of the Year
January 12 – John K. Galbraith, George F. Kennan and Edwin O. Reischauer
January 19 – John W. McCormack
January 26 – Raoul Salan
February 2 – V.K. Krishna Menon
February 9 – Theodore Hesburgh
February 16 – Robert F. Kennedy
February 23 – Konosuke Matsushita
March 2 – John Glenn
March 9 – Tennessee Williams
March 16 – Benyoucef Benkhedda
March 23 – John F. Collins, Lewis W. Cutrer, Richard J. Daley, Robert F. Wagner Jr. & Sam Yorty
March 30 – Arturo Frondizi
April 6 – Sophia Loren
April 13 – Yevgeny Yevtushenko
April 20 – Karl Barth
April 27 – Blas Roca
May 4 – William E. Ogle
May 11 – Paul D. Harkins
May 18 – Frederic G. Donner
May 25 – Billie Sol Estes
June 1 – Bear vs. Bull on Wall Street
June 8 – Walter W. Heller
June 15 – Nelson Rockefeller
June 22 – Don Juan
June 29 – Jack Nicklaus
July 6 – Eugene Ferkauf
July 13 – Edward R. Heath
July 20 – Lucy Douglas Cochrane
July 27 – Samuel Irving Newhouse, Sr.
August 3 – Del Webb
August 10 – D. Brainerd Holmes
August 17 – Harry F. Byrd
August 24 – Andriyan Nikolayev & Pavel Popovich
August 31 – The Wall
September 7 – David Rockefeller
September 14 – Everett Dirksen
September 21 – James Monroe
September 28 – Edward Kennedy
October 5 – John XXIII
October 12 – U.S. Advertising Executives Norman Hulbert Strouse, Fairfax M. Cone, Charles H. Brower, Harry Albert Batten, Leo Burnett, David Ogilvy, Marion Harper Jr., George Homer Gribbin, John Philip Cunningham, Robert Emmett Lusk, Henry Guy Little & Robert Mondell Ganger
October 19 – William Scranton
October 26 – John M. Kemper
November 2 – George W. Anderson Jr.
November 9 – Nikita Khrushchev
November 16 – George W. Romney
November 23 – Joan Baez
November 30 – Jawaharlal Nehru
December 7 – Charles de Gaulle
December 14 – Adlai Stevenson II
December 21 – Vince Lombardi
December 28 – Lynn A. Townsend

1963

January 4 – John XXIII, Man of the Year
January 11 – Wilbur Mills
January 18 – Minoru Yamasaki
January 25 – Great Britain
February 1 – Mortimer Caplin
February 8 – Charles de Gaulle
February 15 – Robert McNamara
February 22 – George Szell
March 1 – Bertram A. Powers
March 8 – William H. Pickering
March 15 – Richard J. Daley
March 22 – Muhammad Ali
March 29 – Gamal Abdel Nasser
April 5 – Orville Freeman
April 12 – Tunku Abdul Rahman
April 19 – Lester B. Pearson
April 26 – Richard Burton
May 3 – Francis Daniels Moore
May 10 – Abraham Lincoln
May 17 – James Baldwin
May 24 – Gordon Cooper
May 31 – 12 Top U.S. Executives (Oil: Rathbone, Steel: Block, Stocks: McCarthy, Manufactures: Cresap, Banking: Peterson, Insurance: Fitzhugh, Airlines: Patterson, Autos: Gordon, Electronics: Thornton, Chemicals: Copeland, Aerospace: Gross & Retail: Lazarus) 
June 7 – John XXIII
June 14 – Barry Goldwater
June 21 – Robert F. Kennedy & John F. Kennedy
June 28 – Paul VI
July 5 – Sargent Shriver
July 12 – Seán Lemass
July 19 – Conrad Hilton
July 26 – H. Edward Gilbert
August 2 – W. Averell Harriman
August 9 – Madame Nhu
August 16 – Michael Ramsey
August 23 – U.S. Atomic Arsenal
August 30 – Roy Wilkins
September 6 – William L. Pereira
September 13 – Red China with caricatures of Mao Zedong, Deng Xiaoping, Liu Shaoqi & Zhou Enlai)
September 20 – International Cinema (Zygmunt Malanowicz & , a still from the film Knife in the Water)
September 27 – George Wallace
October 4 – Tex Thornton
October 11 – Harold Wilson
October 18 – Roger Staubach
October 25 – Alec Douglas-Home
November 1 – Ludwig Erhard
November 8 – Dương Văn Minh
November 15 – Calvin E. Gross
November 22 – Nicole Alphand
November 29 – Lyndon B. Johnson
December 6 – Dean Rusk
December 13 – Nelson Glueck
December 20 – Guy de Rothschild
December 27 – Andrew Wyeth

1964

January 3 – Martin Luther King Jr., Man of the Year
January 10 – Buckminster Fuller
January 17 – John Connally
January 24 – Sex in the U.S.
January 31 – Thomas C. Mann
February 7 – Maurice Couve de Murville
February 14 – Marina Oswald
February 21 – Leonid Brezhnev
February 28 – Thelonious Monk
March 6 – Bobby Baker
March 13 – Julius Nyerere
March 20 – Mike Mansfield
March 27 – John Cheever
April 3 – Norodom Sihanouk
April 10 – Barbra Streisand
April 17 – Lee Iacocca
April 24 – Vladimir Lenin
May 1 – Lyndon B. Johnson
May 8 – Gerald H. Kennedy
May 15 – Henry Cabot Lodge Jr.
May 22 – Nelson Rockefeller
May 29 – Frederick Kappel
June 5 – New York World's Fair, Robert Moses
June 12 – Barry Goldwater
June 19 – Everett Dirksen
June 26 – Kong Le
July 3 – Princess Anne-Marie of Denmark
July 10 – Everett Dirksen & Barry Goldwater
July 17 – William Faulkner
July 24 – Barry Goldwater
July 31 – Harlem
August 7 – Nguyễn Khánh
August 14 – U.S. Grant Sharp Jr.
August 21 – Richard Cushing
August 28 – Lady Bird Johnson
September 4 – Hubert Humphrey & Lyndon B. Johnson
September 11 – Hank Bauer
September 18 – Charles H. Percy
September 25 – The Nuclear Issue
October 2 – Lee Harvey Oswald
October 9 – Hugo Black
October 16 – Pierre Salinger
October 23 – Leonid Brezhnev, Lyndon B. Johnson, Alexei Kosygin & Harold Wilson
October 30 – Kenneth Keating
November 4 – Lyndon B. Johnson
November 6 – Edmund N. Bacon
November 13 – Chou En-lai & Alexei Kosygin
November 20 – Ara Parseghian
November 27 – Lammot Copeland
December 4 – Paul Carlson
December 11 – Buddhism
December 18 – Dorothy Buffum Chandler
December 25 – Christian Renewal

1965

January 1 – Lyndon B. Johnson, Man of the Year
January 8 – Jack Isidor Straus
January 15 – Carl Albert
January 22 – J. William Fulbright
January 29 – Today's Teenagers
February 5 – The Joint Chiefs (David L. McDonald, John P. McConnell, Earle Wheeler, Wallace M. Greene & Harold K. Johnson)
February 12 – Evsei Liberman
February 19 – William Westmoreland
February 26 – Chen Yi
March 5 – Jeanne Moreau
March 12 – Fernando Belaúnde Terry
March 19 – Martin Luther King Jr.
March 26 – Alexei Leonov
April 2 – Computer in Society
April 9 – The World According to Peanuts
April 16 – Rudolf Nureyev
April 23 – James Robinson Risner
April 30 – Harold Wilson
May 7 – Elias Wessin y Wessin
May 14 – The Communications Explosion
May 21 – Rock 'n' Roll
May 28 – Michael E. DeBakey
June 4 – Norton Simon
June 11 – Ed White & James McDivitt
June 18 – Phyllis McGinley
June 25 – McGeorge Bundy
July 2 – A woman (Michael Anderson) at the beach
July 9 – Jim Clark
July 16 – Ho Chi Minh
July 23 – William Pickering
July 30 – Marc Chagall
August 6 – Lyndon B. Johnson
August 13 – Lal Bahadur Shastri
August 20 – The Los Angeles Riot
August 27 – Chris Kraft
September 3 – Charles B. Shuman
September 10 – Henry H. Fowler
September 17 – Ayub Khan & Lal Bahadur Shastri
September 24 – Paul VI
October 1 – Water
October 8 – Fidel Castro
October 15 – Francis Keppel
October 22 – Vietnam War
October 29 – Bill D. Moyers
November 5 – Ian Smith
November 12 – John V. Lindsay
November 19 – The Biggest Blackout
November 26 – Jim Brown
December 3 – Millionaires Under 40 (Merlyn Mickelson, Harold Prince, Arthur Decio, Charles Bluhdorn, John Diebold & Arthur Carlsberg)
December 10 – Harold Keith Johnson
December 17 – Arthur M. Schlesinger Jr.
December 24 – Gemini 6A & Gemini 7 Rendezvous
December 31 – John Maynard Keynes

1966

January 7 – William Westmoreland, Man of the Year
January 14 – U.S. Peace Offensive (Lyndon B. Johnson & advisers; Alexander Shelepin & Ho Chi Minh)
January 21 – Francisco Franco
January 28 – Indira Gandhi
February 4 – Dean Rusk
February 11 – Courtlandt S. Gross
February 18 – Nguyễn Cao Kỳ
February 25 – Artur Rubinstein
March 4 – Robert C. Weaver
March 11 – Maarten Schmidt
March 18 – Nicolae Ceaușescu
March 25 – David Merrick
April 1 – Hubert H. Humphrey
April 8 – Is God Dead?
April 15 – London
April 22 – Thích Trí Quang
April 29 – Danny Escobedo
May 6 – Great College Teachers (George Wald, Dwight Miner, Osborne Bennett Hardison Jr., Martin Diamond, Arnold Arons, Abraham Kaplan, Carl Emil Schorske, Vincent Scully & Anthony Athos)
May 13 – Sargent Shriver
May 20 – James M. Roche
May 27 – King Bhumibol & Queen Sirikit
June 3 – Gary Wilson
June 10 – Juan Marichal
June 17 – Võ Nguyên Giáp
June 24 – Jacob Javits
July 1 – Charles de Gaulle
July 8 – Robert McNamara
July 15 – Suharto
July 22 – Charles C. Tillinghast Jr.
July 29 – Lauren Bacall
August 5 – Luci B. Johnson & Patrick Nugent
August 12 – Charles Whitman
August 19 – James E. Thomson
August 26 – Hendrik Verwoerd
September 2 – Sam Yorty
September 9 – Lin Piao
September 16 – Robert F. Kennedy
September 23 – Rudolf Bing
September 30 – William A.C. Bennett
October 7 – Ronald Reagan
October 14 – Walter Cronkite
October 21 – Ferdinand Marcos
October 28 – Jim Seymour & Terry Hanratty 
November 4 – Lyndon B. Johnson
November 11 – James Pike
November 18 – Republican Winners (Ronald Reagan, George W. Romney, Charles H. Percy, Mark Hatfield, Edward Brooke & Nelson Rockefeller)
November 25 – Julia Child
December 2 – Winthrop Rockefeller
December 9 – Kurt Georg Kiesinger
December 16 – Bennett Cerf
December 23 – Julie Andrews
December 30 – Rudolph A. Peterson

1967

January 6 – Twenty-Five & Under, Man of the Year
January 13 – Mao Tse-tung
January 20 – John W. Gardner
January 27 – Polluted Air
February 3 – Roger Chaffee, Gus Grissom & Ed White
February 10 – Eisaku Satō
February 17 – Edward Brooke
February 24 – Richard Helms
March 3 – Hugh Hefner
March 10 – Henry R. Luce
March 17 – Lynn & Vanessa Redgrave
March 24 – Martin Luther 
March 31 – James S. McDonnell
April 7 – The Pill
April 14 – 1968 Candidates cartoon by Paul Conrad depicting Lyndon B. Johnson, Robert F. Kennedy, Hubert Humphrey, Richard Nixon, Charles H. Percy, Nelson Rockefeller, Ronald Reagan & George W. Romney
April 21 – Costa e Silva
April 28 – Constantine II of Greece
May 5 – William Westmoreland
May 12 – Frank Minis Johnson
May 19 – Johnny Carson
May 26 – Clide Brown Jr.
June 2 – Robert Lowell
June 9 – Levi Eshkol
June 16 – Moshe Dayan
June 23 – Kingman Brewster Jr.
June 30 – Lyndon B. Johnson & Alexei Kosygin 
July 7 – The Hippies
July 14 – King Hussein
July 21 – John Smith
July 28 – Pat Moynihan
August 4 – Detroit Race Riots
August 11 – Whitney M. Young Jr.
August 18 – Bus Mosbacher
August 25 – Inside the Viet Cong
September 1 – Sandy Dennis
September 8 – Harold S. Geneen
September 15 – Nguyễn Văn Thiệu
September 22 – The Beatles
September 29 – An Interracial Wedding (Guy Gibson Smith & Margaret Elizabeth Rusk)
October 6 – Marines at Con Thien
October 13 – Tony Smith
October 20 – Ronald Reagan & Nelson Rockefeller
October 27 – Peace Marchers
November 3 – William F. Buckley Jr.
November 10 – Alexei Kosygin, Nikita Khrushchev, Vladimir Lenin & Joseph Stalin
November 17 – Carl Stokes
November 24 – Harold Wilson
December 1 – Rudi Gernreich
December 8 – Bonnie and Clyde (film)
December 15 – Christiaan Barnard
December 22 – Bob Hope
December 29 – Michael Haider

1968

January 5 – Lyndon B. Johnson, Man of the Year
January 12 – Samuel B. Gould
January 19 – Zubin Mehta
January 26 – Stuart Saunders
February 2 – Lloyd Bucher
February 9 – Võ Nguyên Giáp
February 16 – John K. Galbraith
February 23 – Sergei Gorshkov
March 1 – Bobby Hull
March 8 – Richard Nixon & Nelson Rockefeller
March 15 – Joffrey Ballet's 'Astarte' 
March 22 – Eugene McCarthy
March 29 – Pierre-Paul Schweitzer
April 5 – Alexander Dubček
April 12 – Lyndon B. Johnson
April 19 – Creighton Abrams
April 26 – John Updike
May 3 – Hubert H. Humphrey
May 10 – Mai Văn Bộ, W. Averell Harriman, Xuân Thủy & Cyrus Vance
May 17 – Poverty in America 
May 24 – Robert F. Kennedy
May 31 – Charles de Gaulle
June 7 – The Graduate 1968 
June 14 – Robert F. Kennedy
June 21 – The Gun in America 
June 28 – Aretha Franklin
July 5 – Abe Fortas
July 12 – TV Commercials
July 19 – Tom Reddin
July 26 – Eugene McCarthy & Nelson Rockefeller
August 2 – Nathaniel Alexander Owings
August 9 – Daniel J. Evans
August 16 – Spiro Agnew & Richard Nixon 
August 23 – C. Odumegwu Ojukwu
August 30 – Russian Invasion of Czechoslovakia
September 6 – Hubert H. Humphrey & Edmund Muskie
September 13 – Denny McLain
September 20 – Spiro Agnew
September 27 – Alexander Solzhenitsyn
October 4 – Law and Order
October 11 – Dick Martin & Dan Rowan
October 18 – Curtis LeMay & George Wallace
October 25 – Aristotle Onassis & Jacqueline Kennedy 
November 1 – John Lindsay
November 8 – Lyndon B. Johnson
November 15 – Richard Nixon
November 22 – Paul VI
November 29 – Charles de Gaulle
December 6 – Race for the Moon
December 13 – Yasser Arafat
December 20 – William P. Rogers
December 27 – Johann Sebastian Bach

1969

January 3 – William A. Anders, Frank Borman & Jim Lovell, Men of the Year
January 10 – Edward Kennedy
January 17 – Giovanni Agnelli
January 24 – Richard Nixon
January 31 – Black v. Jew
February 7 – Mia Farrow & Dustin Hoffman
February 14 – Henry Kissinger
February 21 – U.S. Medicine
February 28 – Richard Nixon
March 7 – Charles Bludhorn, James Ling & George William Miller
March 14 – Great Missile Debate
March 21 – Carroll Righter
March 28 – Nguyễn Văn Thiệu
April 4 – Dwight D. Eisenhower
April 11 – Military Under Attack
April 18 – Rage and Reform on Campus (Statue of John Harvard)
April 25 – Ethel Kennedy
May 2 – Robert H. Finch
May 9 – Georges Pompidou
May 16 – Gamal Abdel Nasser
May 23 – Vladimir Nabokov
May 30 – Warren E. Burger
June 6 – Temple Fielding
June 13 – Leonid Brezhnev, Fidel Castro, Nicolae Ceaușescu, Josip Broz Tito & Mao Zedong
June 20 – Troop Withdrawal
June 27 – Prince Charles
July 4 – Cesar Chavez
July 11 – The Sex Explosion
July 18 – Lunar Exploration
July 25 – Neil Armstrong
August 1 – Edward Kennedy
August 8 – John Wayne
August 15 – The Nixon Presidency
August 22 – The Mafia
August 29 – Melvin Laird
September 5 – New York Mets
September 12 – Ho Chi Minh
September 19 – Golda Meir
September 26 – Drugs and the Young
October 3 – Mario Procaccino
October 10 – Willy Brandt
October 17 – Vietnam Moratorium
October 24 – Richard Nixon & Vietnam
October 31 – The Homosexual
November 7 – California
November 14 – Spiro Agnew
November 21 – Spiro Agnew, Richard Nixon, Dean Burch, Walter Cronkite, Chet Huntley, David Brinkley & J. Sargeant Reynolds
November 28 – Raquel Welch
December 5 – William Calley
December 12 – Ralph Nader
December 19 – Milton Friedman
December 26 – Is God Coming Back to Life?

References

 Time cover search
 Time The Vault

Time magazine (1960s)
1960s
Cover of Time magazine